

The Fouga CM.10 was an assault glider designed for the French Army shortly after World War II, capable of carrying 35 troops, later converted as a powered transport.

Design & Development
The CM.10 was a high-wing cantilever monoplane of conventional configuration with fixed tricycle undercarriage. Flight trials with the glider prototypes were of mixed results with the first prototype crashing on 5 May 1948 whilst being flown by CEV Brétigny. A production order for 100 was placed with Fouga, but cancelled after only 5 gliders had been built.

Undaunted, Fouga adapted the design as an airliner, adding two SNECMA 12S piston engines. Two of the production CM.10 gliders were converted to the powered version, CM.100-01,  the first prototype (registration F-WFAV), was first flown on 19 January 1949, but no order resulted for this aircraft. It was later tested with Turbomeca Piméné turbojets mounted on the wingtips as the CM.101R-01. The second aircraft, which was converted as CM.101R-02, (registration F-WFAV), was first flown on 23 Aug 1951.

Variants
CM.10
The original assault glider design, two prototypes built; CM.10-01, first flight 7 June 1947 at Mont de Marsan, crashed on 5 May 1948 whilst on trials at CEV Brétigny; CM.10-02 was first flown in late 1948. Production orders for 100 were cancelled after five gliders were built.
CM.100
Two CM.10 production gliders powered by two SNECMA 12S-02 engines in nacelles on each wing.
CM.101R
The two CM.100s fitted with auxiliary Turbomeca Piméné turbojets on the wing-tips.
CM.103R
A proposed military transport derivative with Turbomeca Marboré wing-tip auxiliary turbojets.

Specifications (CM.100)

See also

Notes

References

External links

 aviafrance.com

1940s French military transport aircraft
Glider aircraft
CM.10
High-wing aircraft
Twin piston-engined tractor aircraft
Aircraft first flown in 1947